Andrea Zimmerer (born 4 June 1965) is a German retired para table tennis player who competed in international elite competitions. She is a double Paralympic medalist, double World medalist and a triple European champion.

References

1965 births
Living people
People from Preetz
German female table tennis players
Paralympic table tennis players of Germany
Table tennis players at the 2008 Summer Paralympics
Medalists at the 2008 Summer Paralympics
Sportspeople from Schleswig-Holstein
21st-century German women